Stanimir Atanasov (born 20 April 1976 in Rousse) is a Bulgarian sprint canoer who has competed from 1995 to 2004. He won a bronze medal in the C-4 500 m event at the 1995 ICF Canoe Sprint World Championships in Duisburg. Atanasov was a European bronze medallist in 1997 (C-2) and 2002 (C-1).

At the 2004 Summer Olympics in Athens, he earned his best finish of eighth in the C-1 500 m event.

References

Sports-reference.com profile

1976 births
Bulgarian male canoeists
Canoeists at the 2004 Summer Olympics
Living people
Olympic canoeists of Bulgaria
Sportspeople from Ruse, Bulgaria
ICF Canoe Sprint World Championships medalists in Canadian